Young Russia may refer to:
 Union of Young Russia - 1920's Russian émigré political movement
 Young Russia (novel) (Rossiya molodaya) - 1952 novel by Yuri German about the era of Peter the Great
 Young Russia (liberal movement) - liberal movement founded in 1998 by Boris Nemtsov
 Young Russia (youth movement) - pro-Vladimir Putin youth movement